Peter Parkas Daji (born 18 July 1960) is a former field hockey player from New Zealand, who was a member of the national team that finished seventh at the 1984 Summer Olympics in Los Angeles, California. Eight years later Daji ended up in eight position at the 1992 Summer Olympics in Barcelona with The Black Sticks. He was born in Auckland.

References

External links
 

New Zealand male field hockey players
Olympic field hockey players of New Zealand
Field hockey players at the 1984 Summer Olympics
Field hockey players at the 1992 Summer Olympics
Field hockey players from Auckland
1958 births
Living people